Carlos Rojas Vila (12 August 1928 – 9 February 2020) was a Spanish author, academic, and artist born in Barcelona in 1928. His father was Carlos Rojas Pinilla, a Colombian doctor, who was in turn the younger brother of Gustavo Rojas Pinilla, the 19th president of Colombia. He attended the University of Barcelona, obtaining his undergraduate degree in 1951. He earned his doctorate in 1955 from the University of Madrid with a study on Richard Ford. In 1960 he began teaching at Emory University in Atlanta, Georgia where he led a distinguished career until his retirement in 1996.

He wrote both non-fiction and fiction, winning awards in both categories.  His first novel De barro y esperanza appeared in 1957. In 1959, he was awarded the Ciudad de Barcelona prize for his work, El asesino de César.. He received the Premio Selecciones de Lengua Española for his 1963 work La ternura del hombre invisible, this was followed in 1968 by the  Premio Nacional de Literatura "Miguel Cervantes" for the novel Auto de Fe. The Premio Planeta de Novela was awarded to him in 1973 for his biographical novel Azaña, four years later, in 1977, he won the Premio Ateneo de Sevilla for Memorias inéditas de José Antonio Primo de Ribera. His 1979 work El Ingenioso hidalgo y poeta Federico García Lorca asciende a los infiernos won the Premio Nadal, and in 1984 he was awarded the Premio Espejo de España for El mundo mítico y mágico de Pablo Picasso. These last works are all fictionalized biographies, a genre of which he was particularly fond.

His writing has been translated into English, French, German, Hungarian, and several Slavic languages

References 

20th-century Spanish male writers
21st-century Spanish writers
1928 births
2020 deaths
Emory University faculty
Spanish people of Colombian descent
University of Barcelona alumni
Writers from Barcelona
Spanish expatriates in the United States